Salem Khalfan (Arabic:سالم خلفان) (born 20 December 1994) is an Emirati footballer. He currently plays as a winger for Al-Sharjah.

Career

youth career
Salem Khalfan started his career at Al Dhaid and is a product of the Al Dhaid's youth system, and joined the youth Al-Sharjah in 2009 .

Al-Sharjah
On 20 October 2013, Salem Khalfan made his professional debut for Al-Sharjah against Al-Dhafra in the Pro League, replacing Ahmed Khamis.

Al-Hamriyah
On 10 September 2017, left Al-Sharjah and signed with Al-Hamriyah.

External links

References

1994 births
Living people
Emirati footballers
Al Dhaid SC players
Sharjah FC players
Al Hamriyah Club players
UAE Pro League players
UAE First Division League players
Association football wingers
Place of birth missing (living people)